Mali sent a  delegation of 17 athletes in 4 sports to the  2008 Summer Olympics in Beijing, China. Most notable Malian participants are the 12 members of the Mali women's national basketball team winners of the FIBA Africa Championship for Women 2007 and Daba Modibo Keita, the 2007 World Taekwondo Champion. The remaining four athletes are Mohamed Coulibaly and  Mariam Pauline Keita in Swimming and Ibrahima Maiga and  Kadiatou Camara in  Track and Field events.

Athletics

Men

Women

Key
Note–Ranks given for track events are within the athlete's heat only
Q = Qualified for the next round
q = Qualified for the next round as a fastest loser or, in field events, by position without achieving the qualifying target
NR = National record
N/A = Round not applicable for the event
Bye = Athlete not required to compete in round

Basketball

Women's tournament
The women's national team qualified by winning FIBA Africa Championship for Women 2007.

Roster

Group play

Swimming

Men

Women

Taekwondo

References

Tout savoir sur les délégations africaines Jean-François Pérès, Radio France International 31 July 2008
Mali athlete list, Sports Illustrated, accessed 2008-08-11.

Nations at the 2008 Summer Olympics
2008
Summer Olympics